Yelisey, Yelisei, Elisey or Elisei (Russian: Елисей) is a Russian masculine given name equivalent to Elisha; it is also an occasional surname. The name may refer to the following notable people:
Elisey (Ganaba) (born 1962), archbishop of the diocese of The Hague and the Netherlands of the Russian Orthodox Church
Elisei Morozov (1798–1868), Russian entrepreneur 
Yelisey Goryachev (1892–1938), Soviet military officer
Valentina Ardean-Elisei (born 1982), Romanian handballer

Russian masculine given names